Vladimir Milenković (born 22 June 1982) is a Serbian football striker who plays for Sinđelić Beograd.

Career
Born in Niš, he played with his hometown club FK Radnički Niš until 2007 with the exception of a short spell in 2005 as a loaned player with Ukrainian FC Vorskla Poltava. Since Radnički was relegated in the season 2007-08 he moved to Montenegrin First League club FK Rudar Pljevlja where he played between January 2008 and January 2009. That winter he moved to Slovenian First League club NK Primorje and next summer he moved to another Slovenian club NK Interblock where he would play 6 months. In January 2010 he moved to Polish top league club Polonia Bytom. In summer 2011 he returned to Serbia and joined Serbian SuperLiga side FK Jagodina. During the second half of the 2012–13 season he played on loan with FK Timok Zaječar in the Serbian First League.  In summer 2013 he returned to the top league signing with his former club FK Radnički Niš.

References

Notes

External links
 Milenković Vladimir  Stats at Utakmica.rs

1982 births
Living people
Sportspeople from Niš
Serbian footballers
Serbian expatriate footballers
FK Radnički Niš players
FK Rudar Pljevlja players
FC Vorskla Poltava players
Ukrainian Premier League players
Expatriate footballers in Ukraine
NK Primorje players
NK IB 1975 Ljubljana players
FK Jagodina players
Expatriate footballers in Slovenia
Polonia Bytom players
Ekstraklasa players
Expatriate footballers in Poland
Association football forwards
Serbian expatriate sportspeople in Poland
FK Timok players
FK Sinđelić Beograd players